Spector is a guitar manufacturing company. It has been based in Woodstock, New York since 1987.

References

External links
Official Stuart Spector Design, LTD. site
Stuart Spector Interviews NAMM Oral History Library (2005, 2019)

Guitar manufacturing companies of the United States
Electric bass guitars by manufacturer
Manufacturing companies established in 1976
1976 establishments in New York (state)